Dženita Zekić (born 31 January 1987), known by the stage name Dzeny, is a Bosnian R&B/Pop singer-songwriter.

Biography
Recent annotations: Increased her popularity as a public figure after being one of 11 finalist, out of 11,000 applicants, of the 6th season of the Bosnian version of American Idol called "Zvijezda mozes biti ti".

She spent her childhood in Dubrovnik, Croatia and Gacko, Bosnia, until she was five. In 1993 she and her family were forced to leave her home and move to Sweden, due to the Bosnian War '92-'93.
Going through the musical midschool, she learned to play the drums, piano, guitar and some other musical instruments. Later on, she studied Systems Science at the University.
She started singing at a very young age, this was when she also became familiar with diverse music recording programmes and started to learn about the recording and mastering processes.

Dzeny is one among a handful of R&B/Pop singers in Bosnia, headed for a new musical direction within her genre, in which an inspiration of the Bosnian sound and style is included. Dzeny is also known to be a philanthropy, where she also was nominated as the Philanthropist of the Year in 2014, by the Bosnian foundation Mozaik.ba, along with 16 other companies and 20 other people.
By now, Dzeny has already had the opportunity to work with several big names, in both Bosnia and in Sweden, such as Fahrudin Pecikoza and Mahir Sarihodzic, with whom she recorded her single and video Kad Zvona Zazvone. This single managed to reach several Bosnian music channels, radio stations, news papers  as well as making it to #6 on one of Bosnia's top lists (where she stayed for several weeks), which also was published in the biggest newspaper in Bosnia - Dnevni avaz, avaz express magazine, one of the most sold Bosnian newspapers.
Her songs were also seen as #1 on other sites such as ubetoo.com, who also published an interview about Dzeny, as their first success story, calling it Passion! And lots of time, nerves and effort

For several years, she went through a heavy path collaborating with diverse indie labels, from whom she learned the important lesson that not everyone can be trusted in the music industry. She spoke openly about this in an interview for Avaz Express Magazine. Going through many disappointments and break points, her former manager wrecking the opportunities for Dzenys career etc., and this leading to the end of those collaborations. Dzeny is today managing her music path on her own, collaborating with above mentioned names and several other producers, as well as having her first album "Zena Zvijer" (The Beast) released in December 2014 with NTV Hayat doo, just until she finds the real and legitimate record label to guide and take her to the top.

Discography
Zena Zvijer Album (2015)
Kad Zvona Zazvone Single (2012)
Midnight Jewel Single (2007)

Career

In 2007, Dzeny releases her first single and Video "Midnight Jewel".

In 2012, Dzeny collaborates with one of Yugoslavia's biggest songwriters "Fahrudin Pecikoza", releasing her single and video "Kad Zvona Zazvone".

In 2013, Dzeny enters the sixth season of Bosnian Idol "ZMBT", and makes it to the finals in May 2014, among 11 000 contestants.

In 2014, Dzeny releases her first single and video "Boja Vatre i Leda", after the Bosnian Idol finals

in 2014, Dzeny releases her first album "Zena Zvijer" (The Beast) in December with NTV Hayat foo

External links
Dzeny Music Official Website
Dzeny Official Facebook fan page

References

1987 births
Living people
Bosniaks of Bosnia and Herzegovina
Bosnia and Herzegovina pop singers
21st-century Bosnia and Herzegovina women singers
Bosnia and Herzegovina Muslims
People from Trebinje
Bosnia and Herzegovina expatriates in Sweden
Hayat Production artists
Bosnia and Herzegovina singer-songwriters